A by-election was held for the New South Wales Legislative Assembly electorate of Central Cumberland on 6 May 1893 because of the resignation of John Nobbs due to bankruptcy.

Dates

Candidates
John Nobbs was the former member.
George McCredie was the Mayor of Prospect and Sherwood.

Result

John Nobbs resigned due to bankruptcy.

See also
Electoral results for the district of Central Cumberland
List of New South Wales state by-elections

Notes

References

1893 elections in Australia
New South Wales state by-elections
1890s in New South Wales